David Carter and Paul Kronk were the defending champions, but none competed this year.

Jan Gunnarsson and Anders Järryd won the title by defeating Ricardo Acuña and Belus Prajoux 7–5, 6–3 in the final.

Seeds

Draw

Draw

References

External links
 Official results archive (ATP)
 Official results archive (ITF)

1983 Grand Prix (tennis)